Obereopsis antenigripennis is a species of beetle in the family Cerambycidae. It was described by Stephan von Breuning in 1977.

References

antenigripennis
Beetles described in 1977